Wadi Bissam is a department of Kanem Region in Chad.  It was created by Order No. 002 / PR / 08 of 19 February 2008.  Its chief town is Mondo.

Subdivisions 
The Wadi Bissam department is divided into 2 sub-prefectures:

 Mondo
 Am Doback

Administration 
List of administrators :

 Prefect of Wadi Bissam (since 2008)

 October 9, 2008   : Sossal Samatete
 November 3, 2009   : Younous Lony

References 

Departments of Chad